was an employee of the town of Minamisanriku's Crisis Management Department, tasked with broadcasting disaster advisories and warnings. 

During the 2011 Tōhoku earthquake and tsunami she remained at her post on the second floor of the three-storey Crisis Management Center continuing to broadcast warnings and alerts over the community loudspeaker system as the tsunami swept over the building silencing the loudspeakers, killing her and overwhelming the town. Of the approximately 40 people who fled to the roof of the building, only 11 survived, by clinging to the rooftop antenna.

She was hailed in the Japanese news media as a heroine for sacrificing her life and was credited with saving many lives. Miki's body was discovered by authorities on 23 April 2011.

The three-storey headquarters of the department remained standing but was completely gutted, with only a red-colored steel skeleton remaining. Photos show the roof of the building completely submerged at the height of the inundation, with some people clinging to the rooftop antenna. The remnants of the building have been preserved during the city's recovery.

References

External links

Miki Endo, missing heroine of Minamisanriku. Video about Miki Endo and the search for her body.

Extreme TSUNAMI in Minamisanriku - Japan 2011.

1986 births
2011 deaths
Victims of the 2011 Tōhoku earthquake and tsunami
Natural disaster deaths in Japan